Bidens pilosa is an annual species of herbaceous flowering plant in the daisy family Asteraceae. Its many common names include hitch hikers, black-jack, beggarticks, farmer’s friends and Spanish needle, but most commonly referred to as cobblers pegs. It is native to the Americas but is widely distributed as an introduced species in other regions worldwide including Eurasia, Africa, Australia, South America and the Pacific Islands. In Chishona, it is called tsine.

Description
Bidens pilosa is a branched annual forb of gracile habit, growing up to 1.8 meters tall. It grows aggressively on disturbed land and often becomes weedy. The leaves are all oppositely arranged and range from simple to pinnate in form, the upper leaves with three to five dentate, ovate-to-lanceolate leaflets. The petioles are slightly winged.

The plant may flower at any time of the year, but  mainly in summer and autumn in temperate regions. The flowers are small heads borne on relatively long peduncles. The heads consist of about four or five broad white ray florets (ligules),  surrounding many tubular yellow disc florets without ligules that develop into barbed fruits. 

The fruits are slightly curved, stiff, rough black rods, tetragonal in cross section, about 1 cm long, typically with two to three stiff, heavily barbed awns at their distal ends. 

The infructescences form stellate spherical burrs about one to two centimeters in diameter. The barbed spines of the achenes get stuck in the feathers, fur, fleeces, clothing, etc. of people or animals that brush against the plant. 
It is an effective means of seed dispersal by zoochory, as the fruits are transported by animals. This mechanism has helped the plant become a noxious weed in temperate and tropical regions. The barbed awns can injure flesh.

Distribution
The species is native to tropical America, widely naturalized throughout the warm temperate and tropical regions of the world.<ref name=bionet>{{cite web|title=Bidens pilosa (Blackjack)|work=BioNET EAFRINET Keys and Factsheets| url=https://keys.lucidcentral.org/keys/v3/eafrinet/weeds/key/weeds/Media/Html/Bidens_pilosa_(Blackjack).htm |access-date=2020-03-25}}</ref> A weed of gardens, woodlands, and waste areas. 

Common names
Its many English common names include black-jack, beggarticks, hairy beggarticks, cobbler's pegs, devil's needles, hairy bidens, Spanish needle, farmers friend, Devils Pitchfork, hitch hikers and sticky beaks.

Uses
Although Bidens pilosa is primarily considered a weed, in many parts of the world it is also a source of food and medicine. The leaves have a resinous flavor, and are eaten raw, in stews, or dried for storage. It is especially important in eastern Africa, where it is known as michicha.

In Vietnam, during the Vietnam War, soldiers adopted the herb as a vegetable, which led to it being known as the "soldier vegetable".
It is susceptible to hand weeding if small enough, even then must be bagged, and thick mulches may prevent it from growing. 

In traditional Chinese medicine, this plant is considered a medicinal herb, called xian feng cao.. In traditional Bafumbira medicine, this plant is applied on a fresh wound and is known as inyabalasanya.. Extracts from Bidens pilosa are used in Southern Africa for malaria.

Chemistry
Almost two hundred compounds have been isolated from B. pilosa'', especially polyacetylenes and flavonoids. The plant contains the chalcone okanin and ethyl caffeate, a hydroxycinnamic acid.

See also
 Alternative medicine
 Chinese classic herbal formula
 Chinese herbology
 Traditional Chinese medicine

References

External links
 PROTAbase Record display for Bidens pilosa. Plant Resources of Tropical Africa (PROTA). Retrieved on 12 April 2010.

pilosa
Flora naturalised in Australia
Flora of North America
Plants used in traditional Chinese medicine
Plants described in 1753
Taxa named by Carl Linnaeus